Sam Cardon is a composer whose credits include 15 large-format films: Titans Of The Ice Age, Mummies, Mystic India, Texas, The Big Picture, Forces Of Nature, Lewis and Clark, The Legendary Journeys, Shackleton's Antarctic Adventure, Mysteries of Egypt, Olympic Glory, Whales, Building the Dream at Hearst Castle in San Simeon, California; Treasure of the Gods at Zion National Park, Utah and The Secret of San Francisco at Pier 39.

In addition, he has written or co-written the themes for National Geographic Explorer, ABC Sunday Night at the Movies, Good Morning America, and provided three hours of original music for the 1988 Winter Olympic Games in Calgary, and music for the 2002 Winter Olympic game Closing Ceremonies at Salt Lake City.  He has also written music for over 40 independent films: My Girlfriend's Boyfriend, Highway To Dhampus, The Velveteen Rabbit, Little Secrets, Beau Jest, The Work And The Glory, American Zion, A House Divided, Return To Secret Garden, The Assignment, Davie And Golimyr, The Wild Stallion. His documentary music includes Fires Of Faith, American Prophet, The Trail Of Hope, America's First Freedom and Meet The Mormons. Video game credits include World of Warcraft, Overwatch, Jet Moto and Twisted Metal.

Cardon grew up in Farmington, New Mexico, and received a bachelor's degree from Brigham Young University in 1993.  He received the Distinguished Honored Alumnus award from Brigham Young University in 2006.  He also received the Governor's Mansion Artist Award from Governor and First Lady Michael and Jacalyn Leavitt from the State of Utah in 2003.

He serves on the Board of Trustees of Snow College, on the Community Relations Board of Utah Valley University and on the College of Fine Arts and Communications Board of Brigham Young University.

Discography

Impulse (1989)  (#2 in Radio And Records Magazine for national airplay)
Serious Leisure (1991)  (#2 in "Radio and Records Magazine" and #17 on Billboard's Contemporary Jazz Chart)
Innovators (1993) with Kurt Bestor - WordPerfect Demo CD ("Missing The Snake Priest" & "La Capitana")
Innovators (1995) with Kurt Bestor
Coming Full Circle (1995) with Kurt Bestor
The New Testament Video Soundtrack (1999) with Kurt Bestor
Old Testament Video Songs (1999)
The Book of Mormon Video Soundtrack (1999) with Kurt Bestor
Doctrine and Covenants and Church History Video Soundtrack (1999) with Kurt Bestor
Digability (2000)
Earth Cinema (2000)
Innovators II: Keepers of the Flame (2001) with Kurt Bestor
Innovators – Live Concert
Faithful
Redemption Road

Producer:

Kalai "Acoustacism"
Kalai "Rebel Hands" (co-producer)

Producer and Arranger:

Jenny Oaks Baker, Then Sings My Soul Billboard #1 on the Traditional Classical Chart
Josh Wright, Josh Wright Billboard #1 on the Traditional Classical Chart

Film scores

On Our Own (1988)
Nora's Christmas Gift (1989)
Rigoletto (1993) with Kurt Bestor & Michael McLean
The Seventh Brother (1994) with Kurt Bestor and Merrill Jenson
Friendship's Field (1995)
Hearst Castle: Building the Dream (1996) IMAX
Zion Canyon Treasure of the Gods (1996) IMAX
Trail of Hope (1997) with Merrill Jenson
Whales (1997) IMAX
Mysteries of Egypt (1998) IMAX
Olympic Glory (1999) IMAX
Return To Secret Garden (2000)
Brigham City (2001)
American Prophet: The Story of Joseph Smith (2000) with Merrill Jenson, Gregory Peck
Shackleton's Antarctic Adventure (2001) IMAX
Little Secrets (2001)
Lewis & Clark Great Journey West (2002) IMAX
The Work and The Glory (2002)
Jumping For Joy (2002)
Someone Was Watching (2002)
Sacred Stone: Temple On The Mississippi (2002) with Merrill Jenson
Texas, The Big Picture (2003) IMAX
Innovators (2003)
The Work And The Glory (2004)
Forces Of Nature (2004) IMAX
The Work and the Glory II: American Zion (2005)
Small Fortunes (2005)
By the Hand of Mormon: Selections From the Original Musical Production with David Piller
Mystic India (2005) IMAX
The Work and the Glory III: A House Divided (2006)
Fire On Ice: The Saints Of Ireland (2006)
The Dance (2006)
Mummies: Secrets of the Pharaohs (2007) IMAX
Heber Holiday (2007)
Passage To Zarahemla (2007)
Reserved To Fight (2008)
Beau Jest (2008)
Davie And Goimyr (2008) stop-motion animation
The Velveteen Rabbit (2009) animated feature
The Wild Stallion (2008)
The Assignment (2010)
Slow Moe (2010)
My Boyfriend's Girlfriend (2010)
The Writer's Block (2010) TV series
Justin Time (2010) TV series pilot
The Messiah (2010) TV series documentary
The Legato Line (airing in 2010)
American Ride (2011)  TV series
The Soul of Kalaupapa (2011)
Fires of Faith (2012) documentary
World of Warcraft: Mists of Pandaria (2012) Global Music Award Winner
Titans Of The Ice Age (2013) IMAX
Highway to Dhampus (2013)
Kama' Aina (2013)
Granite Flats TV series (2013)
Man in the Moon (2013) Glenn Beck and The American Dream Labs
Meet the Mormons (2014)

External links 
 
 Fan Site

Living people
American film score composers
American male film score composers
Latter Day Saints from New Mexico
American television composers
Brigham Young University alumni
Place of birth missing (living people)
Year of birth missing (living people)